Two Mile House is a Gaelic Athletic Association (GAA) club in County Kildare, Ireland. The club grounds are located on The Commons, just off the Dunlavin Road in Two Mile House parish. Eircode is W91 RF84. The parish of Two Mile House is surrounded by the towns of Naas, Newbridge and Kilcullen.

Two Mile House won the 2014 All Ireland JFC Champions after defeating Fuerty of Roscommon 5-7 to 1-11 on 9 February 2014.

Gaelic football

Underage development only really began in earnest in the early 1980s thereby making Two Mile House a relatively young club in real terms. From the late 1990s until recently the focus of the club had been exclusively on Gaelic football. The club men's senior football team is currently playing in the Intermediate Championship and League Division 2.

Some of the notable achievements of TMH players at county level include:
Jimmy O'Connor won an All-Ireland Senior Football Championship medal with Kildare in 1919.
Maurice Colbert (also won a Leinster minor medal), Shane Darcy and Christopher Burke are all holders of Leinster Under-21 Football Championship medals. Adam Conneely won a Leinster u20 medal in 2022.
Peter Kelly won an All Star for the corner back position in 2010.
Mark Sherry, Chris Healy, Adam Burke & Richard Drumgoole Maguire won a Leinster minor championship with Kildare in 2013. Mark Sherry captained the side and Chris Healy won the Man of the Match Award in the Leinster final.

Hurling
The club now fields teams at several levels in underage hurling and this is an area which continues to grow and develop.

Camogie
The camogie club competed in the 1950s and 1960s, beating Caragh 5-0 to 4-2 to win the 1967 county championship. The team got to the Leinster in the 1956 inter-provincial final, and also being selected on the Kildare camogie team of the century. Two Mile House camogie club revived briefly in 1991 and enjoyed many years of underage success until the late 1990s.

Honours 
 Kildare Intermediate Football Champions 2018.
 Leinster Intermediate Club Football Championship 2018.
 Leinster Junior Club Football Championship 2013
 All-Ireland Junior Club Football Championship: 2014
 Kildare Junior A Championship: 1994, 2013
 Kildare Junior C Football Championship 1979 
 Kildare Junior Football League 1935, 1979 
 Kildare Senior Camogie Championship: 1967
 The Leinster Leader Junior Club Cup 2000
 Kildare Junior B Football Championship and League 2004
 Kildare Minor Football League Div 4 2005.
 Kildare Minor B Football Championship 2006, 2017
 Kildare Senior Football League Division 3: 2008, 2013, 2017
 Dowling Cup 2013
 Jack Higgins Cup 2013

Underage Hurling

 Kildare Under-14 Div 3 League Winners 2016
 Kildare Under-12 Div 4 League Winners 2016 
 Kildare Under-12 Div 3 League Winners 2017
 Kildare Under-13 Div 3 Shield Winners 2017
 Kildare Under-14 Feile C Winners      2018
 Kildare Under-16 League Winners 2020  
 Kildare Under-17 Div 3 League Winners 2021

Notable players
 Peter Kelly

References

Bibliography
 Kildare GAA: A Centenary History, by Eoghan Corry, CLG Chill Dara, 1984,  hb  pb
 Kildare GAA yearbook, 1972, 1974, 1978, 1979, 1980 and 2000- in sequence especially the Millennium yearbook of 2000
 Soaring Sliothars: Centenary of Kildare Camogie 1904-2004 by Joan O'Flynn Kildare County Camogie Board.

External links
Kildare GAA site
Kildare GAA club sites
Club website
Kildare on Hoganstand.com
Two Mile House GAA

Gaelic games clubs in County Kildare
Gaelic football clubs in County Kildare